is a JR West Geibi Line station located in Mita, Shiraki-chō, Asakita-ku, Hiroshima, Hiroshima Prefecture, Japan.

History
1915-04-28: Nakamita Station opens
1987-04-01: Japan National Railways is privatized, and Nakamita Station becomes a JR West station

Station building and platforms
Nakamita Station features one island platform capable of handling two lines simultaneously. The station, while privately operated under contract from the railroad, is unmanned. The Nakamita Station building is a simple concrete structure.

Environs
Akimita Post Office
Hiroshima Municipal Mita Elementary School
Mita Nursery School
Misasa River

Highway access
 Hiroshima Prefectural Route 37 (Hiroshima-Miyoshi Route)

Connecting lines
All lines are JR West lines. 
Geibi Line
Commuter Liner/Local
Kamimita Station — Nakamita Station — Shirakiyama Station

External links
 JR West

Railway stations in Hiroshima Prefecture
Geibi Line
Stations of West Japan Railway Company in Hiroshima city
Railway stations in Japan opened in 1915